Gloria Rodríguez Gallego (born 9 July 1948), known for her stage name Gloria Muñoz, is a Spanish theatre, film and television actress.

Biography 
Gloria Rodríguez Gallego (her real name) was born on 9 July 1948 in Madrid.

Filmography 

Film

Television

Accolades

References 

1948 births
Living people
20th-century Spanish actresses
21st-century Spanish actresses
Spanish stage actresses
Spanish television actresses
Spanish film actresses
Actresses from Madrid